Châteldon is a commune in the Puy-de-Dôme department in Auvergne-Rhône-Alpes in central France.

About the town
Châteldon is a medieval village in the northern part of Auvergne. It dates from the early Middle Ages, with many of its buildings dating back to the 14th century. The town's fortifications are still in evidence.

The village lies on the western edge of the Montagne Bourbonnaise and the northern edge of the Livradois-Forez Regional Natural Park, the largest nature park in Europe.  To the west lies the Limagne, where the Allier and Dore rivers converge.  Nineteen kilometres to the north is the City of Vichy.

Château de Châteldon was purchased by Pierre Laval, who went on to serve as the French Prime Minister from 1942 to 1944, in September 1931. Laval purchased it from Léon Sénèque. As of 2014, the castle belonged to the Josée and René de Chambrun Foundation.

Nearby towns
 Lachaux, Puy-Guillaume and Ris ;

Administration

Demographics

Mineral water
Châteldon is known for its naturally carbonated mineral water. It was the first mineral water exploited in France and transported by bottles to the Court of Louis XIV in Versailles. This water is used for its diuretic and digestive properties. It is also rich in potassium, sodium and fluorine. In France, one finds the water of Châteldon in the large hotels and restaurants, and in delicatessens. In 1650, the first doctor of the king, Guy-Crescent Fagon, praised the virtues of Châteldon to Louis XIV.

Notable people
Châteldon was the birthplace of Pierre Laval (1883–1945), French politician and his wife Marguerite Laval (1888–1959), born Claussat, the daughter of the mayor of Chateldon Joseph Claussat.

See also
Communes of the Puy-de-Dôme department

References
 INSEE commune file

External links

Official site of Châteldon

Communes of Puy-de-Dôme